Thomas Ganda (born 10 September 1972) is a Sierra Leonean sprinter. He competed in the men's 4 × 100 metres relay at the 1996 Summer Olympics.

References

External links
 

1972 births
Living people
Athletes (track and field) at the 1992 Summer Olympics
Athletes (track and field) at the 1996 Summer Olympics
Sierra Leonean male sprinters
Sierra Leonean male long jumpers
Olympic athletes of Sierra Leone
Place of birth missing (living people)